City is an American sitcom television series aired on CBS from January 29 to June 8, 1990.<ref>"Land of the Lost (Valerie Harper) TV Series: City" Go Retro!". Retrieved 2015-08-13.</ref> It was a new starring vehicle for Valerie Harper, which went into development not long after she and husband Tony Cacciotti won their lawsuit against Lorimar-Telepictures over her dismissal from her NBC sitcom Valerie (which continued without her as The Hogan Family). City was created by Paul Haggis, and like the previous series was produced by Cacciotti.

Synopsis
Liz Gianni is the city manager of an unnamed city. In her line of work came dealings with the all-too-realistic but sometimes lighthearted issues of the modern-day city, from budget cuts to bureaucratic and political corruption, and the socioeconomic travails of inner-city life. Despite the turmoil that often ensued because of these problems, Liz focused on them with much exuberance, with a little kookiness thrown in, which ultimately made this a return to the type of character that first brought Harper fame on The Mary Tyler Moore Show and Rhoda in the early 1970s. Liz's breezy, Amazonian mentality played more to her advantage at home, where she had to constantly keep up with—-and fret over—-her rapidly maturing 19-year-old daughter Penny. Liz and Penny's frantic repertoire and sweet "mother-daughter" moments, filled with witty dialogue, was the other central base of the show. Liz oversaw a multi-ethnic staff of crazies and eccentrics. Roger Barnett was the assistant city manager who spends most of his time betting on sports and trying to sell a worn-out racehorse he owns. Anna-Maria Batista is the tough Cuban purchasing agent whose most obvious character trait was pronouncing "yep" as "jep". Wanda Jenkins was the sarcastic black secretary, who often discussed how she did not want her young son to turn out like his father, a composer of classical music who actually made very little money. She meets Gloria Elgis, the city social coordinator, a stereotypically beautiful airhead spoiled by her wealthy family; Lance Armstrong, the creepy statistician; and Victor Sloboda, a dumb security guard, who in one episode thought a bandit had stolen the entire supply of White-Out for use in processing records for illegal immigrants. His solution to the problem: painting his entire body in correction fluid in order to "keep his eyes" on the supply! Liz and the gang all answered to Ken Resnick, the totally powerless, monumentally rotten Deputy Mayor. Running the newsstand counter was Sean, an acerbic Irishman. Chuck, an aggressive Asian mail clerk, appeared in the pilot episode.

Cast
Valerie Harper as Liz Gianni
Todd Susman as Roger Barnett
Tyra Ferrell as Wanda Jenkins
Stephen Lee as Ken Resnick
Sam Lloyd as Lance Armstrong
Liz Torres as Anna-Maria Batista
Mary Jo Keenen as Gloria Elgis
James Lorinz as Victor Sloboda
LuAnne Ponce as Penny Gianni
Shay Duffin as Sean
Andy Dick as Sam 
Tony Hale as Fred
Oliver Platt as Jonathan

Ratings and scheduling
On January 29, 1990, the series cracked the Nielsen Top 10. The show kept up this performance through February sweeps, but the early success did not last long. Audiences diminished over the next few months, and although the series pulled respectable numbers at the end of its inaugural season that April, CBS passed on giving City a second season. From January until April, the show aired in the plum time slot of Mondays at 8:30/7:30c, between freshman hit Major Dad and sophomore hit Murphy Brown. CBS then pulled the show for May sweeps, during which time the series was cancelled. City reappeared on Fridays at 8:30/7:30c in June, where it aired three remaining original episodes before leaving the air for good.

Coincidences between City and The Hogan FamilyCity had more than one coincidental occurrence with Harper's former series, now known as The Hogan Family. Ms. Harper's husband, Tony Cacciotti, had served as co-producer on both series. However, the connection became stronger when LuAnne Ponce was cast as Penny Gianni in City—she was the sister of Hogan Family star Danny Ponce (thus giving the Ponce siblings the distinction of having both been TV children of Valerie Harper). Harper's characters on both series had husbands named Michael. As if that weren't enough, CBS just happened to schedule City on Monday nights directly opposite The Hogan Family. Both shows even had a number of episodes directed by Howard Storm. City even used the same Cooper Black credit font that The Hogan Family'' had been using during all seasons in which Harper's replacement on that series, Sandy Duncan, had starred.

Unauthorized use
Despite its short run, the pilot episode continued to be seen by many, through their participation in product and consumer research. Research Systems Corporation, which ran the public invitation-only conventions known as The New Television Preview, had acquired selected copies of the series for showings at their public events, which were falsely passed off, along with actual unaired network pilots, as a test preview for a new series being considered for nationwide broadcast.

Episodes

References

External links
 
 
 City at Sitcoms Online

1990 American television series debuts
1990 American television series endings
1990s American political comedy television series
1990s American sitcoms
Television series created by Paul Haggis
CBS original programming
Television series by CBS Studios
Television series by MTM Enterprises
Television shows set in New York City